Ryszard Kubiak (22 March 1950 – 6 February 2022) was a Polish rowing coxswain who competed in the 1972 Summer Olympics, in the 1976 Summer Olympics, and in the 1980 Summer Olympics. He was born in Bydgoszcz.

In 1972 he was the coxswain of the Polish boat which finished sixth in the eight event. Four years later he finished sixth as cox of the Polish boat in the 1976 coxed pair competition. At the 1980 Games he coxed the Polish boat which won the bronze medal in the coxed fours contest. In the same Olympics he also coxed the Polish team in the 1980 eight event and finished ninth.

He died on 6 February 2022, at the age of 71.

References

External links
 
 profile

1951 births
2022 deaths
Polish male rowers
Coxswains (rowing)
Olympic rowers of Poland
Rowers at the 1972 Summer Olympics
Rowers at the 1976 Summer Olympics
Rowers at the 1980 Summer Olympics
Olympic bronze medalists for Poland
Sportspeople from Bydgoszcz
Olympic medalists in rowing
Medalists at the 1980 Summer Olympics
World Rowing Championships medalists for Poland